"Freaky Deaky" is a song by American rappers Tyga and Doja Cat for the former's upcoming studio album. It is a pop-driven rap track featuring a lullaby-like hook and theme of sexual preferences. It was written by the performers alongside Alyssa Cantu and producers Brandon Hamlin, Dr Luke, Mike Crook, and Ryan Ogren, while Suzanne Vega received a songwriter credit for the interpolation of her 1987 song "Tom's Diner". The single marks the second collaboration between the rappers since 2019, when Tyga was featured on the remix of Doja Cat's "Juicy".

"Freaky Deaky" was released as the lead single of Tyga's eighth upcoming studio album on February 25, 2022. Its release was accompanied by a music video premiere. The visual was directed by Christian Breslauer, and features Tyga being seduced by a sultry dressed Doja Cat. The single peaked at number 43 on Billboard Hot 100 chart. The song crowned Rhythmic Airplay Chart, becoming Tyga's fourth, and Doja Cat's seventh number one on the chart. The track has been certified gold in the United States and New Zealand.

Background and release
Following a commercial and critical fiasco of his sixth studio album Kyoto (2018), Tyga followed it with Legendary (2019), which spawned the US top ten single "Taste" featuring American rapper Offset. Subsequently, the rapper released various buzz singles and was featured in other artists songs. One of his collaborators turned out to be the remix version of Doja Cat's 2019 track "Juicy", which ended up as a lead single of her second studio album Hot Pink (2019). The collaboration became Doja Cat's first Billboard Hot 100 entry, peaking at number 41 in February 2020. Outside the music, Tyga launched his OnlyFans account with adult and behind-the-scenes content.

On February 21, 2022, Tyga and Doja Cat posted a photo of them together on social media with the caption "Friday", alluding to a possible collaboration. Four days later, "Freaky Deaky" was released on digital retrailers and streaming services as the first single of Tyga's upcoming eighth studio album. In an interview with Zane Lowe for Apple Music, Tyga reflected on how easy is working with Doja Cat, calling her a "true artist".

Empire Distribution and RCA Records made "Freaky Deaky" available for airplay on mainstream and rhythmic contemporary radios in the United States on February 25, while the song officially impacted the latter format on March 8. A remix of the track by Dutch-Moroccan disc jockey R3hab was released exclusively for a digital download on Empire Distribution's on-line store on April 14. The next day, it was distributed across all of the music platforms.

Composition and reception
Musically, "Freaky Deaky" is a pop-driven rap song discussing sexual inclinations backed-up by light guitar strings and urban beat. It begins with the hook sang by Doja Cat, which was described as a "breezy lullaby" by Brenton Blanchet of Complex, while Hypebeasts Dylan Kelly opined it is "cheeky". The hook interpolates the melody from "Tom's Diner" by American singer Suzanne Vega. It is followed by three verses by Tyga, in which he describes his sexual  preference. In his third verse, he nods to the artists' earlier collaboration, the remix of "Juicy" (2019), in the line "Forever, forever, ever, juicy, baby". Additionally, the track contains an "energetic" and "fierce" rap verse by Doja Cat.

"Freaky Deaky" has been dubbed as "catchy" by Erika Marie from HotNewHipHop; whereas writing for Uproxx, Wongo Okon called the track "flirtatious". Westdeutscher Rundfunk's Isabel von Glahn opined that the single contains "catchy melody", while the instrumental remains "rather calm". Blanchet wrote that "Freaky Deaky" feels like a "proper collaboration" with "enough vocal flourishes and backing runs". In an article published on Rap-Up, it was opined that both rappers have an "undeniable chemistry". Glahn compared the single with the rappers last collaboration, "Juicy", saying that "Freaky Deaky" is "even sexier". Yohann Rouelle from Pure Charts said that the track is a "voluptuous and carnal invitation to succumb to your desires".

Commercial performance

In the United States, "Freaky Deaky" debuted at its peak of number 43 on the US Billboard Hot 100. The single crowned Rhythmic Airplay Chart on chart issue dated May 14, 2022. According to Luminate Data, it was the most played song at the US monitored rhythmic radio stations, gaining 16% growth in comparison to the previous week, where it logged number three. "Freaky Deaky" became Tyga's fourth and Doja Cat's seventh number one on the aforementioned chart. Additionally, Doja Cat became the first female artist with three songs charting simultaneously in the survey's top ten—her other singles were "Woman" (at number six) and "Get into It (Yuh)" (at number nine). Recording Industry Association of America (RIAA) awarded the single with a gold certification for 500,000 sold units. In Canada, "Freaky Deaky" debuted at number 44, while on Billboard Global 200 it entered at number 37.

Elsewhere, "Freaky Deaky" peaked at number 36 in the United Kingdom, becoming Tyga's eighth, and Doja Cat's 11th, top 40 entry. In Australia, the single entered ARIA Singles Chart at number 29, becoming Tyga's first chart entry since "Haute"―which peaked at number 50 in June 2019―while for Doja Cat, it is her third song that became present on the chart this week, behind "Kiss Me More" (at number 24) and "Woman" (at number 28). The single was certified gold by Recorded Music NZ (RMNZ) for moving 15,000 copies in New Zealand.

Music video
"Freaky Deaky" music video premiered on February 25, 2022, alongside the single release. On the previous day, Tyga posted an 18-second snippet of the visual. It was directed by Christian Breslauer. In the visual, Tyga and Doja Cat are depicted as casual lovers, exchanging sexts. Later, they both prepare for an appointment using high-tech machines that help them dress up; Tyga chose a "simple bright pink" outfit. He is later seen riding through neon-lit city. When they meet, he falls through a trap door to Doja Cat's cat-filled lair. It is preceded by a scene, where the performers are in plastic packaging, while the visual ends with Tyga being tied up by his company. Doja Cat wears various sultry lingerie and colorful PVC outfits, while Tyga plays a role of a voyeur. The music video was dubbed as "flirtatious" in an article published on Rap-Up; whilst Mackenzie Cummings-Grady of HipHopDX called it "colorful". Glahn opined that the video is "almost reminiscent of a sex tape".

Accolades

Track listing
Digital download / streaming
 "Freaky Deaky" – 3:35

Digital download / streaming – R3hab remix
 "Freaky Deaky" (R3hab remix) – 2:20

Credits and personnel

 Tyga – songwriting, rap
 Doja Cat – songwriting, vocals
 Alyssa Lourdiz Cantu – songwriting
 Suzanne Vega – songwriting
 Brandon Hamlin – songwriting, production
 Dr Luke – songwriting, production
 Mike Crook – songwriting, production
 Ryan Ogren – songwriting, production
 Grant Horton – production assistant
 Kalani Thompson – engineering
 Tyler Sheppard – engineering
 John Hanes – mixing
 Serban Ghenea – mixing

Charts

Weekly charts

Year-end charts

Certifications

Release history

References

2022 singles
2022 songs
Tyga songs
Doja Cat songs
Songs written by Tyga
Songs written by Doja Cat
Songs written by Dr. Luke
Songs written by Ryan Ogren
Song recordings produced by Dr. Luke
Empire Distribution singles
Kemosabe Records singles
RCA Records singles